The Night of the Party is a 1934 British mystery thriller film directed by Michael Powell and starring Leslie Banks, Ian Hunter, Jane Baxter, Ernest Thesiger and Malcolm Keen. In the United States it was released as The Murder Party. It was made at the Lime Grove Studios in Shepherd's Bush. The art direction was by Alfred Junge, later a regular contributor to the films of Powell and Pressburger.

Synopsis
After inviting guests to a dinner party the ruthless press baron Lord Studholme is found murdered during a party game. The investigating detectives have to work out which of the guests had the motive to murder him.

Cast

Critical reception
Kinematograph Weekly wrote in 1934, "Direction and production lack that slickness and kick which is so essential to the complete success of this type of manufactured thriller. Few of the stage favourites comprising the cast succeed in adapting their technique to the requirements of the screen." the reviewer however singled out Viola Keats and Ernest Thesiger as the two "who really succeed in establishing definite character." The reviewer added, "the film is just lukewarm mystery entertainment, suitable for second rather than first place on the programme"; while more recently, the Radio Times wrote, "The film's surviving interest is as one of the earliest extant works of Michael Powell, still in his twenties at the time. The project offered little artistic challenge, but he directs fluently enough and seems to have cut short the lengthy courtroom dénouement in favour of a lively, if implausible, interruption by the guilty party."

References

External links 

 Reviews and articles at the Powell & Pressburger Pages

1935 films
1930s mystery thriller films
British mystery thriller films
1930s English-language films
Films directed by Michael Powell
Films by Powell and Pressburger
Films set in London
Films shot at Lime Grove Studios
Gainsborough Pictures films
British black-and-white films
1930s British films